Current differencing transconductance amplifier (CDTA) is a new active circuit element.

Properties
The CDTA is not free from parasitic input capacitances and it can operate in a wide frequency range due to current-mode operation. Some voltage and current mode applications using this element have already been reported in literature, particularly from the area of frequency filtering: general higher-order filters, biquad circuits, all-pass sections, gyrators, simulation of grounded and floating inductances and LCR ladder structures. Other studies propose CDTA-based high-frequency oscillators. Nonlinear CDTA applications are also expected, particularly precise rectifiers, current-mode Schmitt triggers for measuring purposes and signal generation, current-mode multipliers, etc.

Basic operation

The CDTA element with its schematic symbol in Fig 1 has a pair of low-impedance current inputs and p, n and an auxiliary terminal z, whose outgoing current is the difference of input currents. Here, output terminal currents are equal in magnitude, but flow in opposite directions, and the product of transconductance and the voltage at the z terminal gives their magnitudes. Therefore, this active element can be characterized with the following equations:

,
,
,
.

CDTA can be thought as a combination of a current differencing unit followed by a dual-output operational transconductance amplifier, DO-OTA. Note that gm is a function of the bias current. When this element is used in CDTA, one of its input terminals is grounded (e.g.). With dual output availability,  condition is assumed.

References
Biolek, D.: CDTA – Building Block for Current- Mode Analog Signal Processing. In: Proceedings of the ECCTD’03, Kraków, Poland, Vol. III, (2003), 397-400
Keskin A.Ü., Biolek, D., Hancioglu, E., Biolková, V: Current-mode KHN filter employing current differencing transconductance amplifiers, AEU - International Journal of Electronics and Communications, 60, (2006), 443-446
Chen, H. Tsao, C. Chen,: Operational transresistance amplifier using CMOS technology. Electronic Letters., 28, 22 (1992), 2087–2088.

Electronic amplifiers